Gippsicola is a genus of Australian tube dwelling spiders that was first described by Henry Roughton Hogg in 1900. It is no longer considered a junior synonym of Segestria due to anatomical differences in the pedipalps of males and the receptaculum in females.

Species
 it contains four species, found in New South Wales, Victoria, and Queensland:
Gippsicola lineata Giroti & Brescovit, 2017 – Australia (Queensland)
Gippsicola minuta Giroti & Brescovit, 2017 – Australia (Queensland)
Gippsicola raleighi Hogg, 1900 (type) – Australia (Western, South, Victoria)
Gippsicola robusta Giroti & Brescovit, 2017 – Australia (Queensland, New South Wales)

See also
 List of Segestriidae species

References

Araneomorphae genera
Segestriidae
Spiders of Australia